Sklené Teplice is a small spa village and municipality in Žiar nad Hronom District in the Banská Bystrica Region of central Slovakia.  It is close to the historic town of Banská Štiavnica.

History
In historical records the village was mentioned for the first time in 1340 and was founded by Glaser Filius Gerhardi de Doplicze.  Historical records for the spa come from 1549 in the chronicles of Juraj Wernher.

The first spa was built in this valley in 1701.  Aristocratic travelers from across Europe visited the site.  The spa community achieved prominence on August 27, 1786 when the world's first academic scientific congress was held here.  The congress was attended by notable intellectuals, including Johann Wolfgang von Goethe.  The current spa complex dates from the early 1900s.

Geography
The village lies at an altitude of 360 metres and covers an area of 10.913 km². It has a population of 449 people (as of 2006). The village lies in the Štiavnica Mountains, about halfway between Žiar nad Hronom and Banská Štiavnica.

Point of interests
 Kursalón, Sklené Teplice

References

External links
 Municipal website 
 Slovak Tourist Board website 

Villages and municipalities in Žiar nad Hronom District
Spa towns in Slovakia